Cordell Hull Lake is a lake in the Cumberland River in north-central Tennessee, about forty miles east of Nashville, in the vicinity of Carthage.

Cordell Hull Dam, on the Cumberland River, was built by the United States Army Corps of Engineers between May 1963 and November 1973 for navigation, hydroelectric power generation and recreation. The dam is a concrete and earthen gravity structure, 87 feet high (above streambed), with a generator capacity of 100 megawatts.

Both are named for Cordell Hull, former United States Secretary of State.

References

External links 
 U.S. Army Corps of Engineers web site
 
 Cordell Hull Birthplace and Museum State Park

Protected areas of Clay County, Tennessee
Protected areas of Jackson County, Tennessee
Reservoirs in Tennessee
Dams in Tennessee
United States Army Corps of Engineers dams
Protected areas of Smith County, Tennessee
Bodies of water of Clay County, Tennessee
Bodies of water of Jackson County, Tennessee
Bodies of water of Smith County, Tennessee
Dams completed in 1973
1973 establishments in Tennessee
Cumberland River